Wilderlands of High Fantasy is a supplement for fantasy role-playing games published by Judges Guild in 1977. It is part of the same world as their earlier City State of the Invincible Overlord setting materials.

Contents
Wilderlands of High Fantasy is a campaign setting that describes the locations of five large maps (Wilderlands Maps 1-5).

The regions described are as follows: City State of Invincible Overlord (#1), Barbarian Altantis (#2), Glow Worm Steppes (#3), Tarantis (#4), and Valon (#5) and are shown in full detail on the judge's maps and are roughly sketched out on the players' maps. The booklet describes and gives the location of many of the villages, castles, islands, ruins, relics, and monsters.

Publication history
Wilderlands of High Fantasy was written by Bob Bledsaw and Bill Owen, and was published by Judges Guild in 1977 as five large maps (judge and player versions), a 12-page booklet, and a 16-page booklet. Later releases included one 32-page book and (2 versions each) of five large maps (judge and player versions).

Judges Guild initially operated on a subscription model to their customers, and after several other installments, their installments N and O comprised the Wilderlands of High Fantasy supplement, which opened up the world of the City State. A listing of cumulative sales from 1981 shows that Wilderlands of High Fantasy sold over 15,000 units.

In June 2002 Judges Guild announced a new partnership with Necromancer Games, who would release Judges Guild products starting in 2003. Necromancer started advertising the upcoming publication of Wilderlands of High Fantasy and City State of the Invincible Overlord almost immediately. They released large collectors' editions of City State of the Invincible Overlord (2004) and Wilderlands of High Fantasy (2005).

Reception
 Don Turnbull reviewed Wilderlands of High Fantasy for White Dwarf #6, and commented that "It is good, and well worth the money, particularly if you are a 'fantasy campaign' fan."

References

Dungeons & Dragons campaign settings
Judges Guild fantasy role-playing game supplements
Role-playing game supplements introduced in 1977